Almanza is a Spanish surname. Notable people with the surname include:

 Albert Almanza (born 1935/1936 or 1940), Mexican-American basketball player
 Armando Almanza (born 1972), American baseball player
 Ashley Almanza (born 1964), South African businessman
 Cristóbal Téllez de Almanza, Governor-General of the Philippines
 Eduardo Almanza Morales, Mexican druglord
 Eduardo Castro Almanza (born 1954), Mexican long-distance runner
 Eusebia Adriana Cosme Almanza (1908–1976), Afro-Cuban poetry reciter and actress
 Guadalupe García Almanza (born 1960), Mexican politician
 Nestor Almanza (born 1971), Cuban wrestler
 Martín Enríquez de Almanza (died 1583), Viceroy of New Spain
 Raymundo Almanza Morales, Mexican druglord
 Rose Mary Almanza (born 1992), Cuban middle-distance runner
 Rubén Almanza (1929–2020), Mexican basketball player
 Susana Almanza, environmental activist and politician